Hidaj (also Haiyeh, also Romanized as Hayā and Khiya) is a city in the Central District of Abhar County, Zanjan province, Iran. At the 2006 census, its population was 11,798 in 3,011 households. The following census in 2011 counted 13,003 people in 3,764 households. The latest census in 2016 showed a population of 13,840 people in 4,309 households.

References 

Abhar County

Cities in Zanjan Province

Populated places in Zanjan Province

Populated places in Abhar County